The 1971 Holy Cross Crusaders football team was an American football team that represented the College of the Holy Cross during the 1971 NCAA University Division football season. Ed Doherty took over for his first year as head coach. The team compiled a record of 4–6.

Holy Cross competed as an independent despite having announced in May 1971 that the Crusaders, along with the Boston University Terriers, would join the Yankee Conference. Because their previous scheduling commitments would not allow them to play the full Yankee round-robin in 1971 and 1972, HC and BU continued to compete as football independents and were not eligible for the Yankee Conference championship. Holy Cross did play non-conference games against two longstanding Yankee teams in 1971, losing to both Connecticut and Massachusetts.

All home games were played at Fitton Field on the Holy Cross campus in Worcester, Massachusetts.

Schedule

Statistical leaders
Statistical leaders for the 1971 Crusaders included: 
 Rushing: Joe Wilson, 973 yards and 9 touchdowns on 177 attempts
 Passing: Mickey Connolly, 433 yards, 35 completions and 4 touchdowns on 85 attempts
 Receiving: Jack VonOhlen, 260 yards and 2 touchdowns on 16 receptions
 Scoring: Joe Wilson, 54 points from 9 touchdowns
 Total offense: Joe Wilson, 973 yards (all rushing)
 All-purpose yards: Joe Wilson, 1,128 yards (973 rushing, 114 receiving)
 Interceptions: Dan Harper, 5 interceptions for 93 yards

References

Holy Cross
Holy Cross Crusaders football seasons
Holy Cross Crusaders football